A with ogonek (А̨ а̨; italics: А̨ а̨) is a letter of the Cyrillic alphabet used in the Lithuanian Cyrillic alphabet and Polish Cyrillic alphabet, used after the failed January Uprising and a subsequent ban on the Latin script until 1904.

Technical Information

References

Cyrillic letters with diacritics